Redes may refer to:

 Redes Natural Park, Spain
 Redes (film), a 1936 Mexican film about a fishing community
 Redes (Revueltas), the score of the 1936 Mexican film
 , a popular science program on Spanish TV presented by Eduard Punset
 Rodney Redes, Paraguayan footballer